Manche-d'Épée Ecological Reserve is an ecological reserve in Quebec, Canada. It was established on April 11, 1984.

References

External links
 Official website from Government of Québec

Protected areas of Gaspésie–Îles-de-la-Madeleine
Nature reserves in Quebec
Protected areas established in 1984
1984 establishments in Quebec